Raymond Christopher Perry (born December 27, 1981) is a former American college and professional football player who was a running back in the National Football League (NFL) for five seasons during the mid-2000s.  He played college football for the University of Michigan, and received All-American honors.  He was chosen by the Cincinnati Bengals in the first round of the 2004 NFL Draft, and played his entire NFL career for the Bengals.

Early years
Perry was born in Advance, North Carolina.  He attended Fork Union Military Academy in Fork Union, Virginia, where he helped his team win multiple VISFA State Championships.

College career
Perry attended the University of Michigan, where he played for coach Lloyd Carr's Michigan Wolverines football team from 2000 to 2003.  As a senior in 2003, he rushed for 1,674 yards and 18 touchdowns and finished fourth in Heisman Trophy voting and fourth in Michigan annals for rushing yards in a season.  Perry was recognized as a consensus All-American, and also received the Doak Walker Award, given to the nation's top running back, was the Big Ten Conference rushing champion, and was named the Big Ten Conference MVP.

Perry set a Michigan game record with 51 carries in a 27–20 win over Michigan State on November 1, 2003.  He finished his career at Michigan fifth on the school's career rushing list with 3,696 yards and third in rushing touchdowns with 39.

Professional career

Cincinnati Bengals
Perry was selected by the Cincinnati Bengals in the first round (26th overall) in the 2004 NFL Draft. He made his NFL debut at the Pittsburgh Steelers on October 3, but he played only two games in his rookie season with the Bengals due to injuries.

Perry played in the 2005 season, complementing Pro Bowl running back Rudi Johnson. Perry finished the 2005 season with 279 rushing yards along with 51 receptions for 328 yards and two touchdowns. His 51 receptions were the most by a Bengals running back in one season since James Brooks caught 54 passes in 1986.

Perry fractured his leg in the 11th game of the 2006 season, ending his season.  On August 27, 2008, the Bengals cut running back Rudi Johnson from the team, solidifying Perry as the starter for the 2008 season. Perry was released after the season on April 27, 2009.

NFL statistics

Cincinnati Bengals

2004 season
In the 2004 season, Perry played in only two games, starting neither of them. He ran the ball twice, gaining 1 yard, with a long of 1 yard and no touchdowns, for an average of 0.5 yds/carry. However, he caught three receptions for 33 yards, with a long of 13 yards and no touchdowns, for an average of 11 yds/reception. He never fumbled.

2005 season
In 2005, he played in 14 games, only starting two. He rushed 61 times for 279 yards.

Career statistics

College

See also
 Michigan Wolverines football statistical leaders

References

External links
 Cincinnati Bengals bio

1981 births
Living people
African-American players of American football
All-American college football players
American football running backs
Cincinnati Bengals players
Michigan Wolverines football players
People from Davie County, North Carolina
Players of American football from North Carolina
21st-century African-American sportspeople
20th-century African-American people